Philip Geoffrey Saffman FRS (19 March 1931 – 17 August 2008) was a mathematician and the Theodore von Kármán Professor of Applied Mathematics and Aeronautics at the California Institute of Technology.

Education and early life
Saffman was born to a Jewish family in Leeds, England, and educated at Roundhay Grammar School and Trinity College, Cambridge which he entered aged 15. He received his Bachelor of Arts degree in 1953, studied for Part III of the Cambridge Mathematical Tripos in 1954 and was awarded his PhD in 1956 for research supervised by George Batchelor.

Career and research
Saffman started his academic career as a lecturer at the University of Cambridge, then joined King's College London as a Reader. Saffman joined the Caltech faculty in 1964 and was named the Theodore von Kármán Professor in 1995. According to Dan Meiron, Saffman "really was one of the leading figures in fluid mechanics," and he influenced almost every subfield of that discipline. He is known (with his co-author Geoffrey Ingram Taylor) for the Saffman–Taylor instability in viscous fingering of fluid boundaries, a phenomenon important for its applications in enhanced oil recovery, and for the Saffman–Delbrück model of protein diffusion in membranes which he published with his Caltech colleague and Pasadena neighbour Max Delbrück. He made important contributions to the theory of vorticity arising from the motion of ships and aircraft through water and air; his work on wake turbulence led the airlines to increase the minimum time between takeoffs of aircraft on the same runway. Saffman also studied the flow of spheroidal particles in a fluid, such as bubbles in a carbonated beverage or corpuscles in blood; his work overturned previous assumptions that inertia was an important factor in these particles' motion and showed instead that Non-Newtonian properties of fluids play a significant role.

Along with his many research papers, Saffman wrote a book, Vortex Dynamics, surveying a field to which he had been a principal contributor. Russel E. Caflisch writes that "This book should be read by everyone interested in vortex dynamics or fluid dynamics in general."

Awards and honours
Saffman was elected a Fellow of the American Academy of Arts and Sciences and a Fellow of the Royal Society in 1986, and the recipient of the American Physical Society's Otto Laporte Award. His nomination for the Royal Society reads:

Personal life
Saffman was survived by his wife (Ruth Arion whom he married in 1954), three children (Mark, Louise, Emma), and eight grandchildren (Timothy, Gregory, Rae, Jenny, Nadine, Aaron, Miriam, Alexandra and Andrey.

References

 P.A. Davidson, Y. Kaneda, K. Moffatt, and K.R. Sreenivasan (eds, 2011).  A Voyage Through Turbulence, chapter 12, pp 393–425, Cambridge University Press  

1931 births
2008 deaths
Alumni of Trinity College, Cambridge
20th-century British mathematicians
21st-century British mathematicians
Fluid dynamicists
California Institute of Technology faculty
Fellows of the American Academy of Arts and Sciences
Fellows of the Royal Society
Academics of King's College London